The 1921–22 season was the 41st season of football played by Nelson. It was their first season as a professional club, and their first in the Football League Third Division North, after the restructuring of the English league system. The side ended the season in 16th place in the division, finishing behind Barrow on goal average. The campaign started on 27 August 1921 with a 1–2 defeat by Wigan Borough, which was attended by a then record crowd of 9,000 at Seedhill. Nelson's first win in the Football League came on 3 September 1921, when they beat Wigan Borough 4–1 at Springfield Park. The season ended with a 0–0 draw at home to Tranmere Rovers on 6 May 1922. By the end of the campaign, the side had a league record of 13 wins, seven draws and 18 defeats, giving them a total of 33 points.

In the FA Cup, the side entered the competition in the Fourth Qualifying Round. They defeated Accrington Stanley and then won their Fifth Qualifying Round match 3–2 at home to Rochdale. However, they did not progress past the Sixth Qualifying Round, when they were knocked out by Worksop Town.

Season review

Events 
 27 August: Billy Halligan scores Nelson's first-ever goal in the Football League, two minutes into the first game of the season against Wigan Borough.
 3 September: Nelson get their first win in the Football League, defeating Wigan Borough 4–1 at Springfield Park.
 8 October: Nelson's six-match unbeaten run in the league comes to an end following a 1–4 defeat away at Accrington Stanley.
 19 November: Nelson progress through to the Fifth Qualifying Round of the FA Cup with a 1–0 win over Accrington Stanley.
 3 December: A 3–2 victory over Rochdale sees Nelson through to the Sixth Qualifying Round of the FA Cup.
 17 December: Nelson are knocked out of the FA Cup, losing 1–2 away at Worksop Town.
 2 January: The side achieve their biggest win of the campaign, a 4–0 victory against Wrexham at Seedhill.
 28 January: Hartlepools United inflict Nelson's heaviest defeat of the season, a 6–1 drubbing at Victoria Park.
 6 May: Nelson draw their final league game of the season, a 0–0 draw at home to Tranmere Rovers.

League progress 
The chart below shows Nelson's league positions throughout the course of the 1921–22 season. The green area (position 1) represents the automatic promotion place to the Football League Second Division, while the red area (positions 19 and 20) shows the teams who had to apply for re-election to the League at the end of the season. The highest position achieved by Nelson during the season was 1st place, after the fourth match. In the middle of the season Nelson slipped down the league table, eventually finishing in 16th position.

Statistics

League position

Player details 
During the 1921–22 season, 29 different players appeared in at least one competitive match for Nelson. The table below shows the number of appearances and goals scored by each player.

FW = Forward, MF = Midfielder, GK = Goalkeeper, DF = Defender

Match results

Football League Third Division North

FA Cup

Fourth Qualifying Round

Fifth Qualifying Round

Sixth Qualifying Round

References 
General
 

Specific

Nelson F.C. seasons
Nelson